Stefan Šapić (born 26 February 1997) is a Serbian footballer who plays for Russian club Torpedo Moscow.

Club career
Šapić was licensed for the 2015–16 Serbian SuperLiga season, together with all other players of youth team, and he was given jersey number 65. Previously, Šapić was performed with Žarkovo. As soon as he signed his first professional contract with Čukarički, Šapić made his senior debut for Čukarički on 27 March 2016, in a postponed Serbian SuperLiga match of 26 fixture, against Mladost Lučani. After he won the Serbian youth league as a captain on youth team and qualified to the 2016–17 UEFA Youth League, Šapić was also with the first team, but without matches in the 2016–17 UEFA Europa League. In last days of the summer transfer window 2016, Šapić moved to Serbian First League side Sinđelić Beograd at dual registration until the end of 2016–17 season. He also extended a loan to Sinđelić deal until the end of 2017. Šapić made his first start for Čukarički in the 5th fixture of the 2018–19 Serbian SuperLiga campaign, in 1–0 victory over Proleter Novi Sad.

On 8 September 2022, Šapić signed with the Russian Premier League club Torpedo Moscow. In his second game for Torpedo on 17 September 2022, he scored the only goal of the game, 1–0 victory over CSKA Moscow to give Torpedo their first win since returning to the Premier League.

Career statistics

References

External links
 Stefan Šapić stats at utakmica.rs 
 
 
 

1997 births
Living people
Footballers from Belgrade
Association football midfielders
Association football central defenders
Serbian footballers
FK Čukarički players
FK Sinđelić Beograd players
FC Torpedo Moscow players
Serbian First League players
Serbian SuperLiga players
Russian Premier League players
Serbian expatriate footballers
Expatriate footballers in Russia
Serbian expatriate sportspeople in Russia